Comedy Premieres was a programming strand of four one-off television comedies, produced by Granada Television for the ITV network and broadcast throughout 1997.

Premieres

Production 
The Premieres, all pilots for potential television series, were produced from 1995 to 1996 for intended broadcast in 1996. However, they were all postponed until 1997.

Reception 
Cold Feet received positive critical reaction from The Times; in The Times, Matthew Bond wrote that it is "an enjoyable one-off comedy aimed at anybody who's ever been single, married, or had children. With such catholic appeal further heightened by Helen Baxendale heading a talented cast, it showed just what ITV can do." An ITV committee selected Cold Feet to represent the network in the comedy-drama category at the Montreux Television Festival. The programme won the Silver Rose in the Humour category and the Golden Rose of Montreux, the festival's highest honour. Further acclaim came at the end of the year at the British Comedy Awards when Cold Feet won the Best Comedy Drama (ITV) award.

Alexander Chancellor previewed The Chest for The Observer, calling it "homely" and concluded that "If you don't mind implausible plots and inconclusive endings, you may find this quite enjoyable to watch; but don't expect to laugh very much." In The Independent, Tina Ogle noted that Neil Morrissey was playing a "typical fluffy bunny", but singled out Jim Carter as the best actor. Thomas Sutcliffe for the same newspaper was more critical of Morrissey, writing that he was putting on "his 10-year-old boy act", and concluded by saying The Chest "makes you want to run someone through with a cutlass." Matthew Bond criticised the story for being "a familiar variation of a familiar story" but complimented the main cast for holding it together.

The Grimleys received acclaim for its 1970s nostalgia. Mark Lawson called it "a rare example of a period sitcom" and compared Darren Grimley to Adrian Mole. John Millar for the Daily Record anticipated a full series would follow the pilot and Eddie Gibb for The Scotsman named it the best sitcom of the year. The broadcast was watched by 4.6 million, gaining a 42% audience share.

King Leek was described in The People as having "sheer comic class". The reviewer praised both the leads and the supporting cast and concluded by calling it the best of the four comedy premieres. Matthew Bond wrote that Billy Ivory had written "something so black that it was nigh on impossible to see the comedy at all." Desmond Christy of The Guardian was equally disappointed and hoped a series would not follow the pilot.

The Grimleys and Cold Feet were each commissioned for full series. The Grimleys ran for three series from 1999 to 2001, and Cold Feet ran for five series from 1998 to 2003 and, after a thirteen-year hiatus, for four more series from 2016 to 2020.

References

External links 
Cold Feet at the British Film Institute
The Chest at the British Film Institute
The Grimleys at the British Film Institute
King Leek at the British Film Institute

1997 British television series debuts
1997 British television series endings
ITV (TV network) original programming
1997 in British television
Television pilot seasons
Television series by ITV Studios
English-language television shows